Monroe Downtown Historic District is a national historic district located at Monroe, Union County, North Carolina.  It encompasses 25 contributing buildings and 1 contributing object in the central business district of Monroe.  The district developed during the late 19th and early 20th centuries and includes notable examples of Late Victorian and Classical Revival architecture styles. Located in the district is the separately listed Union County Courthouse.  Other notable buildings include the Hotel Joffre Building (1917-1919), Bank of Union Building (1905-1906), Belk/Bundy Building (1911), Monroe Bank & Trust Company Building (1919-1920), Monroe Hardware Company Building (1928), and Secrest Building (1928).

It was listed on the National Register of Historic Places in 1988.

References

Historic districts on the National Register of Historic Places in North Carolina
Victorian architecture in North Carolina
Neoclassical architecture in North Carolina
Buildings and structures in Union County, North Carolina
National Register of Historic Places in Union County, North Carolina